The following is a list of notable alumni of Choate Rosemary Hall, also known informally simply as Choate. A private, college-preparatory, boarding school located in Wallingford, Connecticut, it took its present name and began a coeducational system with the merger in 1971 of two single-sex establishments: the Choate School (founded in 1896 in Wallingford) and Rosemary Hall (founded in 1890 in Wallingford, moved later to Greenwich, Connecticut).



A

 Edward Albee '46, Pulitzer-winning playwright
 Lauren Ambrose (did not graduate), film and TV actress
 William Attwood '37, diplomat and journalist

B
 William Sims Bainbridge '58, sociologist
 Felix Barker (exchange student), British historian, theatre and film critic, president of The Critics' Circle
 David N. Barkhausen, Illinois state legislator and lawyer
 Florieda Batson '21, hurdler, 1922 Olympian
 Nat Benchley '64, writer, actor, producer
 Joseph Beninati, real estate developer and private equity investor
 Stephen Bogardus '72, Obie-winning stage actor
 Chester Bowles '19, governor of Connecticut, US ambassador to India

C

 Arne H. Carlson '53, governor of Minnesota
 Dov Charney '87, head of American Apparel
 Noah Charney '98, novelist and art historian
 Tanay Chheda 2014, film actor
 Julie Chu 2001, Olympic hockey player
Kristen Clarke '93, Civil Rights lawyer
 Glenn Close '65, actress
Jeff Coby '13, Haitian-American basketball player
 Lewis Augustus Coffin 1908, architect
 Geoffrey Cowan '60, Emmy-winning producer, playwright, director
 Cason Crane 2011, mountain climber
 Caresse Crosby 1910 (Mary Phelps Jacob, Mrs. Harry Crosby), socialite, poet
 Jamie Lee Curtis '76, BAFTA, Golden Globe and Oscar-winning actress

D

 John Danilovich '68, diplomat, U.S. ambassador to Brazil and Costa Rica, CEO of Millennium Challenge Corporation
 Mathieu Darche '96, NHL ice hockey player
 Chris Denorfia '98, MLB baseball player
 Bruce Dern (did not graduate), actor
 Tom Dey '83, film director
 Lorenzo di Bonaventura '76, film producer, president of Warner Brothers
 Donna Dickenson '63, philosopher, medical ethicist
 John Dos Passos 1911, novelist
 Michael Douglas '63, two-time Oscar-winning actor
 John T. Downey '47, spy, prisoner of war, judge
 Paul Draper '54, winemaker
 Andres Duany '67, architect, urban planner, founder of the New Urbanism movement
 Avery Dulles '36, educator, philosopher, Cardinal of the Roman Catholic Church
 Matt Dunne '88, Vermont state senator and state representative

E
 Walter D. Edmonds '21, historical novelist

F
 Caterina Fake '86, founder of Flickr
 Robert Fitzgerald '29, poet, critic, classicist, translator
 Geoffrey S. Fletcher '88, Oscar-winning screenwriter and film director
 Katherine B. Forrest '82, U.S. federal judge

G

 Oliver M. Gale '27, advertising and public relations pioneer
 Bruce Gelb '45, president of Clairol, U.S. ambassador to Belgium
 Paul Giamatti '85, Emmy- and SAG-winning actor
 Philip Gourevitch '79, journalist, author
 James Griffin '51, philosopher
 Roy Richard Grinker '79, anthropologist

H

 Jin Ha 2008, American actor known for his roles in the TV series Devs and Love Life in addition to the musical Hamilton William O. Harbach '40, Emmy- and Peabody-winner, founding producer of The Tonight Show and The Steve Allen Show Amanda Hearst 2002, heiress, journalist, philanthropist
 Buck Henry '48, comedian, actor, director, and screenwriter
 Hong Jung-wook '89, Korean entrepreneur and ex-politician
 Brian Hartzer '85, chairman, BeyondPay

I
 Kim Insalaco '99, Olympic hockey player
 Brett Icahn businessman

J
 Eric M. Javits '48, American ambassador, nephew of Senator Jacob Javits
 Hardy Jones '61, conservationist filmmaker, author

K

 Bob Kasten '60, U.S. Senator from Wisconsin
 William Kaufmann '35, Cold War strategist
 John F. Kennedy '35, 35th President of the United States
 Joseph Kennedy Jr. '33, naval pilot
 Sarah Kernochan '65, novelist, screenwriter, songwriter, and Oscar-winning director
 Whitman Knapp '27, U.S. federal judge
 Hilary Knight 2007, Olympic hockey player
 John K. Koelsch '41, Medal of Honor recipient
 Herbert Kohler, Jr. '57, president of the Kohler Company
 Ben Kurland (did not graduate), film and TV actor

L

 James Laughlin '32, poet and founder of New Directions Publishing
 Alan Jay Lerner '36, creator of My Fair Lady, Camelot, and Gigi, winner of three Oscars and three Tonys
 Elad Levy '89, leader, researcher, innovator, for the treatment of stroke in neurosurgery 
 Sir Michael Lindsay-Hogg (did not graduate), stage and television director, actor, writer
 Alan Lomax '30, pioneering ethnomusicologist, folklorist, oral historian

M

 Robert McCallum Jr. '64, U.S. ambassador to Australia
 Douglas McGrath '76, actor, director, screenwriter
 Ali MacGraw '56, Golden Globe-winning actress
 George J. Mead 1911, aircraft engineer, co-founder of Pratt & Whitney
 Paul Mellon '25, philanthropist, art collector, donor of the Yale Center for British Art and the National Gallery of Art East Wing
 Peter Rodgers Melnick '76, film, theater, and television composer
 Tift Merritt '93, singer-songwriter
 Helen Stevenson Meyner '46, U.S. Congresswoman from New Jersey
 Rebecca Miller '80, actress, screenwriter, director, novelist
 William T. Monroe '68, diplomat, U.S. ambassador to Bahrain
 Emil "Bus" Mosbacher '39, yachtsman, America's Cup winner, U.S. Chief of Protocol
 Robert Mosbacher '44, U.S. Secretary of Commerce
 Robert Mosbacher Jr. '69, Republican Politician and Former President and CEO of Overseas Private Investment Corporation

N
 Abdi Nazemian '94, Iranian-American writer, recipient of the 2017 Lambda Literary Award for Debut Fiction
Nicholas Negroponte '61, founder of MIT Media Lab and One Laptop per Child
 Philip Nel '88, scholar of children's literature
 Bruce Nelson '58, history professor
 Douglass North '38, Nobel Laureate in Economics
 Victoria Nuland '79, U.S. ambassador to NATO, Assistant Secretary of State for European and Eurasian Affairs

O
 Terry O'Neill '70, feminist, president of the National Organization for Women (NOW)
 Emily Oster '98, economist and author
 Ifeoma Ozoma, technology policy researcher

P
 Laurie L. Patton '79, 17th president of Middlebury College and president of American Academy of Religion in 2019
 James Peck '32, World War II pacifist, Freedom Rider during the Civil Rights Movement
 Stacey Plaskett '84, U. S. Virgin Islands delegate to the United States House of Representatives
 Josephine Pucci 2009, U.S. Women's National Hockey Team member
 Jim Pyne '90, NFL player

R
 Prince Anthony Stanislas Radziwill '78, Emmy- and Peabody-winning producer of Primetime Live Luis Armando Roche '57, Venezuelan film director
 Rick Rosenthal '66, award-winning film and TV director
 Angela Ruggiero '98, Olympic hockey player, U.S. member of the International Olympic Committee

S

 Nicholas Schaffner '70, author, journalist
 Jamie Schroeder '99, American rower, Olympic gold-medalist, Oxford Blue, winner of The Boat Race
 John Burnham Schwartz '83, novelist
 Martha Schwendener '85, lead singer and songwriter of Bowery Electric
 Maria Semple '82, novelist and screenwriter
 Frederick Charles Shrady '28, sculptor, painter, awarded the Légion d'honneur
 Michael David Shulman (did not graduate), writer, artist, philanthropist
 Bill Simmons '88, sportswriter
 Hedrick Smith '51, New York Times editor, Pulitzer Prize-winner, Emmy-winning PBS producer
 Lee Smith '80, journalist
 Window Snyder '93, digital security innovator
 Gustaf Sobin '53, poet, novelist, and belle-lettrist
 Khari Stephenson 2000, MLS soccer player and member of the Jamaica national football team
 Roger L. Stevens '28, theatrical producer, founding chairman of the National Endowment for the Arts and the Kennedy Center
 Adlai Stevenson '18, two-time Democratic presidential candidate, governor of Illinois, U.S. Ambassador to the United Nations
 James Surowiecki '84, author, New Yorker staff writer

T
 Ivanka Trump 2000, heiress, fashion model, entrepreneur, and presidential advisor

U
 Ian Underwood '59, multi instrumentalist, member of the Mothers of Invention.

V
 Chris Vlasto '84, Emmy-winning producer of Good Morning America and 20/20''

W
 Prince Jigyel Ugyen Wangchuk 2003, heir presumptive to the throne of Bhutan
 Frank "Muddy" Waters '43, American college football coach
 Katharine Way '20, Manhattan Project nuclear physicist
 H. Bradford Westerfield '44, political scientist
 George Whipple III '73, lawyer and society reporter for NY1
 James Whitmore '40, Tony- and Emmy-winning actor
 David Williams '86, NHL ice hockey player
 Geoffrey Wolff '55, novelist and belle-lettrist

Y
 Alexander Morgan Young '88, president of production at 20th Century Fox
 Philip Young '27, Dean of the Columbia Business School and U.S. ambassador to the Netherlands

X

Z
 Paul Zaloom '70, puppeteer, actor, and educator

References

Chaote Rosemary Hall alumni
Choate Rosemary Hall alumni